Judith Nicosia is a soprano who is based in New Jersey.  Winner of the soprano competition at the Paris International Voice Competition in 1972, she had her Carnegie Hall debut in 1981. A graduate of Ithaca College, Nicosia is currently a professor of voice in the Mason Gross School of the Arts at Rutgers University and tours widely as a classical soloist.

References

External links
 Rutgers University bio

American women singers
Living people
Year of birth missing (living people)
Ithaca College alumni
Rutgers University faculty
American women academics
21st-century American women